The Mubazzarah Dam is located at the foothills of Jebel Hafit in Al Ain, the Eastern Region of the Emirate of Abu Dhabi, the United Arab Emirates (UAE). It has been dubbed 'the oldest water installation in Abu Dhabi's recent history'.

Sheikh Zayed 
The dam was one of a number of development projects undertaken by Sheikh Zayed bin Sultan Al Nahyan in his time as governor of Al Ain, before his accession as Ruler of Abu Dhabi in 1966, and appointment as first President of the UAE in 1971. First constructed in 1955, the dam was restored fifty years later in 2005 by a team from the Department of Antiquities and Tourism in Al Ain.

The dam was the first attempt to harness the water flowing off Jebel Hafit during the rainy winter season, but was superseded by the drilling of the deep well and construction of a man-made geyser at the centre of the Green Mubazzarah tourist resort. This well has, in turn, depleted the water flow to the nearby Ain Al Faydah hot springs.

References 

Dams in the United Arab Emirates
History of the United Arab Emirates